Eric Coble is an American playwright and screenwriter. He is a member of the Playwrights' Unit of the Cleveland Play House.

Eric Coble was born in Edinburgh, Scotland and raised on the Navajo and Ute reservations in New Mexico and Colorado.  Before turning to playwriting, he received his BA in English from Fort Lewis College in Colorado, and his MFA in acting from Ohio University.

Career
Coble's play, The Velocity of Autumn premiered on Broadway on April 1, 2014 (previews), officially on April 21, 2014, at the Booth Theatre, starring Estelle Parsons and Stephen Spinella, directed by Molly Smith.  The play was nominated for the Pulitzer Prize for Drama.  Estelle Parsons received a Tony Award nomination for Best Actress in a Play. The play had its debut at the Boise Contemporary Theatre before moving to Arena Stage, Washington, D.C., in 2013.

The Spanish version, La velocidad del otoño, premiered at the Teatro Bellas Artes in Madrid in December 2016. It starred Lola Herrera and Juanjo Artero and was directed by Magüi Mira.

His play Bright Ideas opened Off-Broadway at the Manhattan Class Company, directed by John Rando, and has since been published by Dramatists Play Service, with dozens of productions across the U.S.  His stage adaptation of Lois Lowry's The Giver (published by Dramatic Publishing) has had over 300 productions on three continents.  Other work includes Natural Selection (published by Playscripts), For Better (published by Samuel French), The Dead Guy (published by DPS), Virtual Devotion, Cinderella Confidential, and Pecos Bill and the Ghost Stampede (all published by Dramatic Publishing).

His plays have been produced in 50 states of the U.S., and on six continents including productions at The Kennedy Center, Manhattan Class Company, Actors Studio, Playwrights Horizons, The Denver Center Theatre Company, Arena Stage, The Edinburgh and New York Fringe Festivals, South Coast Repertory, Laguna Playhouse, Alliance Theatre, Cleveland Play House, Actors Theatre of Louisville, Cleveland Public Thaeatre, Indiana Repertory, Coterie Theatre, Asolo Rep, Curious Theatre, Geva Theatre, Alabama Shakespeare Festival, Dobama Theatre, Stages Repertory, Great Lakes Theater, Coterie Theatre, Boise Contemporary Theatre, Habima Theatre (Israel), Pentacion Productions (Spain), Teatr Polski (Poland), Orange Row (Mexico)and the Contemporary American Theatre Festival.

Awards include an Emmy nomination, the Steinberg New Play Award, two American Alliance for Theatre and Education Distinguished Play Awards for Best Adaptation, the AATE Award for Distinguished Play (2022), the AT&T Onstage Award, National Theatre Conference Playwriting Award, an NEA Playwright in Residence Grant, two TCG Extended Collaboration Grants, Aristophanes Award for Best Off-Broadway Comedy, First Place in the Southwest Festival of New Plays, Heideman Finalist for Actors Theatre Louisville, three Best of the CATCO Shorts Festival Awards, the Cleveland Arts Prize, two Cuyahoga Arts and Culture Creative Workforce Fellowships, and four Ohio Arts Individual Excellence Awards.

Selected works

References

External links
 Off Broadway production of Bright Ideas
 Bio at Dobama Theater
 Interview at Charlotte Theater
 Interview at CoolCleveland by Linda Eisenstein
 Playscripts, Inc. playwright profile

American male screenwriters
21st-century American dramatists and playwrights
Year of birth missing (living people)
Fort Lewis College alumni
Ohio University alumni
Living people
Writers from Edinburgh
American male dramatists and playwrights
21st-century American male writers
21st-century American screenwriters
Theatre people from Edinburgh